Croppy was a nickname given to United Irishmen rebels during the Irish Rebellion of 1798 against British rule in Ireland.

History 

The nickname "Croppy" was used in 18th-century Ireland in reference to the cropped hair worn by Irish nationalists who were opposed to the wearing of powdered periwigs closely associated with members of the Protestant Ascendancy. They were inspired by the sans-culottes of the French Revolution, who also forewent the wearing of periwigs and other symbols associated with the aristocracy. During the Irish Rebellion of 1798 against British rule in Ireland, many United Irishmen rebels wore cropped hair, which led the Dublin Castle administration and government forces (in particular the militia and yeomanry) to frequently arrest anyone wearing the hairstyle as a suspected rebel. A form of torture known as pitchcapping was specifically invented to use on "croppies", who retaliated by cropping the hair of Irish unionists to reduce the reliability of this method of identifying their sympathisers.

See also 
 Defenders
 Ribbonmen
 The Croppy Boy
 Whiteboys

References 

 The name is referenced in the title of two folk-songs of the period: the Loyalist song, Croppies Lie Down and the rebel song The Croppy Boy.
 The memorial park in front of Collins Barracks, Dublin (now a part of the National Museum of Ireland) is known as Croppies' Acre, as the remains of people executed during and after the 1798 Rising were dumped there for the incoming tide of the tidal Liffey to remove; it was long thought they had been buried there.
 In the church at Crooke, County Waterford, there is a marker to indicate the grave of the Unknown Croppy, (the "Unknown Soldier" of the rebellion) as the nearby Passage East and Geneva Barracks were sites of execution and transportation of many Irishmen. (The GPS coordinates for the grave of the Croppy Boy are N 52° 13.642' W006° 58.756' and the GPS coordinates for Geneva Barracks are N 52° 13.042' W006° 58.737'.)
 The Pikeman Memorial in Tralee, a sculpture of a United Irishman commemorating the 1798 Rising, is known locally as The Croppy Boy.
 Seamus Heaney commemorated the fate of thousands of fallen United Irishmen in his 1966 poem Requiem for the Croppies.
 The term is used throughout Leon Uris' historical novel on Ireland, Trinity.

External links 
 Song Lyrics - The Croppy Boy - Folksong
 Poem - Requiem for the Croppies - Seamus Heaney

Irish Rebellion of 1798
Political slurs for people